Leopold Township is one of seven townships in Perry County, Indiana, United States. As of the 2010 census, its population was 765 and it contained 319 housing units.

History
Leopold Township was established in 1847, and named after Leopold I of Belgium.

Geography

Unincorporated towns
 Leopold at 
 Terry at 
(This list is based on USGS data and may include former settlements.)

Cemeteries
The township contains these five cemeteries: Frakes, Lanman, Rennie, Rhodes and Saint Johns.

Major highways
  Indiana State Road 37

Lakes
 Tipsaw Lake

School districts
 Perry Central Community School Corporation

Political districts
 State House District 73
 State Senate District 47

References
 
 United States Census Bureau 2009 TIGER/Line Shapefiles
 IndianaMap

External links
 Indiana Township Association
 United Township Association of Indiana
 City-Data.com page for Leopold Township

Townships in Perry County, Indiana
Townships in Indiana